Renal ischemia also known as nephric ischaemia, is the deficiency of blood in one or both kidneys or nephrons, usually due to functional constriction or actual obstruction of a blood vessel.

References

Kidney diseases
Ischemia